The Austrian film industry produced over fifty feature films in 2014. This article fully lists all non-pornographic films, including short films, that had a release date in that year and which were at least partly made by Austria. It does not include films first released in previous years that had release dates in 2014.

Major releases

Minor releases

Notable deaths

See also

 2014 in film
 2014 in Austria
 Cinema of Austria
 List of Austrian submissions for the Academy Award for Best Foreign Language Film

References

External links

Austrian
Films
2014